Michael Robert Yabsley (born 30 June 1956) is a former Australian politician. He was a Liberal member of the New South Wales Legislative Assembly, representing the electorates of Bligh from 1984 to 1988 and Vaucluse from 1988 to 1994.

Biography 
Yabsley was born in Lismore, and attended private schools in the area. He attended the Australian National University, where he received a Bachelor of Arts with a double major in political science. He went on to work as a public relations manager for the Livestock and Grain Producers Association.

Aged 24 years, Yabsley was a candidate for the 1980 federal election for Fraser in the Australian Capital Territory for the Liberal Party.  However he was defeated by Labor's Ken Fry. In 1984, Yabsley defeated Labor MP Fred Miller to win the NSW state seat of Bligh in Sydney for the Liberal Party. However, in 1988 he was defeated by Independent candidate Clover Moore. The death of Ray Aston, the Liberal member for Vaucluse, allowed Yabsley to re-enter parliament; he was elected unopposed in the by-election. He was immediately appointed as Minister for Corrective Services and in 1991 was promoted as Minister for State Development and Minister for Tourism.

While Minister for Corrective Services, Yabsley was instrumental in creating Australia's 1989 "Truth in sentencing" legislation, ending the early release of prisoners for good behaviour. Yabsley had previously expressed outrage that an anti-apartheid activist was released from a one-month sentence for altering a piece of graffiti, after spending only a week in prison. In 1977, Yabsley wrote an article for Woroni denying that South Africa still practised apartheid, and saying "even the most iniquitous aspects of apartheid" was preferable to the country being ruled by Africans.

Yabsley resigned from the ministry in 1992, in protest of the circumstances that brought about the resignation of Premier Nick Greiner and Environment Minister Tim Moore. Greiner resigned after three independents, who held the balance of power, told Greiner that unless he resigned, they would withdraw their support from the government and support a no-confidence motion. One of those independents was Clover Moore who had defeated Yabsley in Bligh at the 1988 election. The presence of the independents in Parliament would also be a factor to his eventual resignation from Parliament. Ironically just as Moore was responsible for the end of Yabsley's first ministerial and parliamentary career, she indirectly caused the end of Yabsley's ministerial and, eventually, parliamentary career. Yabsley resigned from parliament in 1994.

Personal life 
On 5 November 1983, Yabsley married Susan Clatworthy, and they had two children. Following a diagnosis of prostate cancer in 2019, Yabsley separated from his wife and came out as gay in 2020.

References

 

1956 births
Living people
Liberal Party of Australia members of the Parliament of New South Wales
Members of the New South Wales Legislative Assembly
LGBT legislators in Australia
Australian National University alumni
LGBT conservatism